Jeff Lindsay (born 1952) is an American author.

Jeff Lindsay  may also refer to:

Jeff Lindsay, co-founder of Hacker Dojo and inventor of Webhook
Jeff Lindsay, mixed martial artist; see TJ Waldburger

See also
Geoff Lindsey, British writer and director